The Queensland Railways B16½ class locomotive was a one-off 2-6-2 steam locomotive operated by the Queensland Railways.

History
In August 1918, the North Ipswich Railway Workshops completed an experimental locomotive designed to burn coke instead of coal in an attempt to reduce smoke nuisance caused by coal in Brisbane suburban tunnels. Per Queensland Railway's classification system it was designated the B16 class, B representing that it had three driving axles, and the 16 the cylinder diameter in inches. It was also experimentally built as a 2-6-2 and fitted with Southern valve gear. It was modified to burn coal in June 1927.

To provide enough heating surface to generate sufficient steam through its projected use the firebox was made wider for greater burning capacity. The two wheel trailing truck enabled the fitting of a wide firebox, necessary for a coke burning locomotive. The engine was originally fitted with the surplus tender from PB15 N° 411 after it was converted to a one off member of the 6D15 class. The tender was later changed to a standard C16 class locomotive tender to increase its potential range. The engine spent its working life on the Brisbane to Ipswich line working coal trains. It was withdrawn in February 1950.

References

External links
B16½ class Queensland's Railways Interest Group

Railway locomotives introduced in 1918
B16
2-6-2 locomotives